The 8th edition of the ICF Carrom cup was held in Pune, India from 2 to 6 December 2019. This was the 3rd consecutive ICF cup India has hosted. India won the men's team event and women's team event title.

Irshad Ahmed Ansari of India defeated 2018 World Cup winner Prashant More to claim his maiden international trophy in the men's singles event. In the women's singles event, S. Apoorva of India beat Ayesha Mohamed of India to complete a hat trick of international titles as she won the singles title in 2016 Carrom World Championship and 2018 Carrom World Cup.

Participating teams 
A total of 16 nations participated in the 5 day fiesta.

Men's team event 
A total of 16 teams participated in the men's team event. The top 8 teams were selected to compete in a knockout round based on players' performance in the singles event. India defeated Sri Lanka (3-0) to win the men's title while Bangladesh beat Maldives (2-1) to win the bronze medal.

Men's team event results

Women's team event 
Seven teams participated in the women's team event. The top 4 teams qualified based on the players' performance in the singles event. India won the women's team event, beating Sri Lanka (3-0) in the finals. The Maldives women's team achieved 2nd rank for the first time in 12 years in the international arena. They beat Sri Lanka 2–1 in the semi finals. Sri Lanka claimed 3rd place by beating Bangladesh with a 3–0 win.

Women's team event results

Swiss league 
86 players participated in the mixed singles event. A maximum of 8 (4 men and 4 women) players from each country was given entry to play in this event, whereas sixteen players from the host (India) competed in this event. Zaheer Pasha from India won the Swiss league undefeated and scoring 5 slams in 8 matches. Anil Munde from India claimed 2nd Place while 2014 World Cup Champion Komaravelli Srinivas was the 3rd rank.

Swiss league ranking (top 15) 

 Zaheeer Pasha - India
 Anil Munde - India
 Komaravelli Srinivas - India
 Irshad Ahmed - India
 Kumarii Kajal - India
 Rajesh Gohil - India
 Prashant Suryakant More - India
 WD Nishantha Fernando - Sri Lanka
 Louis Fernandes - Canada
 Anas Ahamed - Sri Lanka
 Hafizur Rahman - Bangladesh
 Rashmi Kumari - India
 Sandeep Dive - India
 Abhijeet Tripankar - India
 Nilam Ghodake - India

Men's singles 
A total of 32 players who qualified to singles event were divided in to 8 groups. The top 2 qualified to the round of 16. Irshad Ahmed of India beat world champion Prashant More 2–1 to claim the title. This tournament was Irshad Ahmed's first International. Prashant More failed to make history by winning 3 consecutive International titles. Rajesh Gohil of India beat fan's favourite Zaheer Pasha 2–1 to claim third place.

Men's singles top 8 ranking 

 Irshad Ahamed - India
 Prashant Suryakant More - India
 Gohil Rajesh - India
 Zaheer Paasha - India
 Hemaet Molla - Bangladesh
 Nishantha Fernando - Sri Lanka
 Shaheed Hilmy - Sri Lanka
 Ismail "Neal" Azmeen - Maldives

Women's singles 
24 players competed in the group stage. The top 2 from each group competed in the quarter finals. S.Apoorva of India beat Ayesha Mohamed of India to complete a hatrick of international titles as she won the singles title in 2016 Carrom World Championship and 2018 Carrom World Cup. Former World Champion Rashmi Kumari of India beat young star Nagajyothi to win 3rd Place.

Women's singles top 8 ranking 

 S. Apoorva - India
 Ayesha Mohamed - India
 Rashmii Kumari - India
 Nagarjyothi - India
 Rebeca Dalrine - Sri Lanka
 Maduka Dilshani - Sri Lanka
 Aminath Vidhaadh - Maldives
 Roshita Joseph - Sri Lanka

References 

Carrom
2019 in Indian sport
2019 in Bangladeshi sport
2019 in Sri Lankan sport